Nawabzada Nasrullah Khan (13 November 1916 – 27 September 2003) was a senior politician in British India and later Pakistan. He was also a prominent Urdu poet. He was the only West Pakistani to have served as the leader of the Awami League of Bangladesh.Urdu: نواب زاده نصر الله خان لیلیزئی

Early life and career
He was born in Khangarh, Punjab in Muzaffargarh District in southern Punjab.

He started his political career in 1933 by joining a religious political party namely the Majlis-e-Ahrar-e-Islam, soon after it was formed by Syed Ata ullah Shah Bukhari. He was also elected the Secretary General of All India Majlis-e-Ahrar-e-Islam in 1945. This party held an Indian Nationalist position. Nawabzada Nasrullah Khan, coming from a background with ties to the Indian National Congress and Majlis-e-Ahrar-ul-Islam, opposed the Muslim League and its demand for the partition of India. However, he joined the All-India Muslim League in 1947 after the partition of India and the creation of Pakistan occurred. He won a seat of Provincial Assembly of Punjab in general elections in 1952 and the National Assembly of Pakistan seat in the 1962 general elections. In 1964, he supported Fatima Jinnah in the election against president Ayub Khan. In 1966, he served as the President of the Awami League party mostly active in former East Pakistan. In June 1967, he founded his own political party named as Pakistan Democratic Party and served its chairman till his death in 2003. He helped form the opposition alliance Democratic Action Committee to remove military dictator President Ayub Khan from power. In 1993, he was elected again to the National Assembly of Pakistan. He was also made the chairperson of the Kashmir Committee. Just before his death, he was the Chairman of Alliance for Restoration of Democracy (ARD) working for the restoration of democracy in Pakistan against General Pervez Musharraf.

Death and legacy
He died on 27 September 2003 after being admitted to a hospital in Islamabad, following a heart attack. He was 86 years old. He is buried in Khangarh, District Muzaffargarh, Punjab, Pakistan. His survivors include five sons and four daughters.

A major Pakistani English-language newspaper comments about him, "Known for his Hukka, dark achkan and distinctive cap, Nawabzada Nasrullah Khan spent all his life in fighting against dictators, military as well as civilian, and struggled to strengthen the parliamentary democracy, bothering little how he would go down in history for targeting all governments."

In its obituary for Nawabzada Nasrullah Khan, Dawn (newspaper) of Pakistan called him
a 'Crusading democrat'.

Another major English-language newspaper The Nation (Pakistan) ran his obituary in its editorial - titled, 'Death of a veteran'.

Family Tree

References

1916 births
2003 deaths
Pakistani democracy activists
Politicians from Lahore
Politicians from Punjab, Pakistan
Aitchison College alumni
Pakistani prisoners and detainees
Pakistani MNAs 1962–1965
Secretary Generals of Majlis-e-Ahrar-ul-Islam
People from Muzaffargarh
Politicians from Muzaffargarh